Clube Atlético Aliança, commonly referred to as Aliança, was a Brazilian football club based in Santana, Amapá. Founded in 1995, it last competed in the 2003 Campeonato Amapaense before folding in 2008 due to continuing financial constraints.

History
The club was founded on 15 November 1995. Aliança won the Campeonato Amapaense in 1998, and finished as runners-up in 1999, losing the competition to Ypiranga.

Achievements

 Campeonato Amapaense:
 Winners (1): 1998

Stadium
Clube Atlético Aliança played their home games at Estádio Antônio Villela, nicknamed Vilelão. The stadium has a maximum capacity of 3,000 people.

References

Defunct football clubs in Amapá
Association football clubs established in 1973
Association football clubs disestablished in 2008
1973 establishments in Brazil
2008 disestablishments in Brazil